Kamchatka Krai is a federal subject of Russia (a krai), situated in the Russian Far East, and is administratively part of the Far Eastern Federal District. Its capital and largest city is Petropavlovsk-Kamchatsky,  home to over half of its population of 291,705 (2021). 

Kamchatka Krai was formed on July 1, 2007, as a result of the merger of Kamchatka Oblast and Koryak Autonomous Okrug, based on the voting in a referendum on the issue on October 23, 2005. The okrug retains the status of a special administrative division of the krai, under the name of Koryak Okrug.

The Kamchatka Peninsula forms the majority of the krai's territory, separating the Sea of Okhotsk and the Bering Sea in the Pacific Ocean. The remainder is formed by a minor northern mainland portion, Karaginsky Island, and the Commander Islands in the Bering Sea. It is bordered by Magadan Oblast to the west and Chukotka Autonomous Okrug to the north. Kamchatka Krai is an active volcanic zone that is home to Kluchevskaya, the highest active volcano in Eurasia, and the Decade Volcanoes of Avachinsky and Koryaksky.

Geography
Kamchatka Krai occupies the territory of the Kamchatka Peninsula, the adjacent part of the mainland, the island Karaginsky and the Commander Islands. It is bounded to the east by the Bering Sea of the Pacific Ocean (a coastline of more than ) and to the west by the Okhotsk Sea (a coastline of approximately ).

Heights: Khuvkhoitun, Ledyanaya, Acute, Shishel, Tylele volcano.

The longest rivers are the Vyvenka, Penzhina, Talovka, Lakhacha, Apuka, Kamchatka, and Ukelayat. The largest freshwater lakes are Kronotskoye, Talovskoye, and Palanskoye.

Peninsulas: Olyutor Peninsula, Gavena Peninsula, Ilpinsky Peninsula, Ozernoy Peninsula, Kamchatskiy Peninsula, and the Yelistratova Peninsula.

Islands (NW-NE going clockwise): Verkhoturov Island, Karaginsky Island, the Commander Islands, Ptichy Island (Kamchatka Krai), Konus Island, Zubchaty Island, Rovny Island, Dobrzhanskogo Island, Vtoroy Island, Krayniy Island and Trety Island. Despite their proximity, the Kuril Islands are not part of Kamchatka Krai, falling instead under Sakhalin Oblast.

Kamchatka belongs to the zone of volcanic activity, there are about 300 large and medium-sized volcanoes, 29 of them are active. The largest volcano in Eurasia – Kluchevskaya (altitude ). With the volcanic activity associated with the formation of many minerals and a manifestation of hydro geothermal activity: education fumaroles, geysers, hot springs, etc.

Despite Kamchatka lying at similar latitudes to Scotland, it is mostly subarctic, more continental in the hinterland, and more maritime and prone to monsoons on the coast.

Nature

Most of the peninsula is covered with forests of stone birch, while alder and cedar elfin are commonly found at higher altitudes. In central areas, especially in the Kamchatka River valley, widespread forests of larch and spruce can be found. In floodplains, forests grow with fragrant poplar, alder, Chosenia, and Sakhalin willow. In the second tier, undergrowth such as the common hawthorn, Asian cherry, Kamchatka rowan, and shrubs growing Kamchatka elderberries, Kamchatka honeysuckle, meadowsweet, willow shrubs, and many other species.

More than 14.5% of the territory of the Kamchatka Territory is specially protected. There are six protected areas of federal significance (three-state reserves, one federal reserve "South Kamchatka," two spa areas – "Resort Paratunka," "Malkinskie mineral waters"); four natural parks of regional significance ("Nalychevo," "Bystrinsky," "South Kamchatka," "Kluchevskoy"); 22 reserves of regional importance; 116 monuments of nature; four protected areas (landscape natural park "Blue Lake," Southwest and Tundra Sobolewski reserves).

Kronotsky Nature Reserve is a nature area reserved for the study of natural sciences in the remote Russian Far East, on the coast of the Kamchatka Peninsula. It also has Russia's only geyser basin, plus several mountain ranges with numerous volcanoes, both active and extinct. Due to its often harsh climate and its mix of volcanoes and geysers, it is frequently described as the "Land of Fire and Ice".

It is mainly accessible only to scientists, plus approximately 3,000 tourists annually who pay a fee equivalent to US$700 to travel by helicopter for a single day's visit. Kronotsky Nature Reserve has been proclaimed a World Heritage Site by UNESCO.

Climate

Legislative Assembly
The legislative assembly was formed in 2007 after the merger of Kamchatka Oblast and Koryak Autonomous Okrug. It therefore replaced the Council of People's Deputies of Kamchatka Oblast (1997-2007) and the Duma of Koryak Autonomous Okrug (1994-2007).

The Chairman of the Legislative Assembly of Kamchatka Krai is the presiding officer of that legislature:

Administrative divisions

Economy
The main industries in Kamchatka include fishing and forestry. Coal and other raw materials are extracted. Due to its geographical location near major shipping routes, it is a center for shipbuilding, ship repair, and related services. There are also oil and mineral resources which are yet to be fully developed.

The largest companies in the region include Kamchatskenergo (power distribution company with revenues of $ million in 2017), Oceanrybflot (fishing company, $ million), Morskoy Trast ($ million), Amethystvoye Mining and Processing Combine (gold mine, part of Renova Group, $ million).

Demographics
Population: 
 Births (2008 Jan–Nov): 3,673 (11.55 per 1000)
 Deaths (2008 Jan–Nov): 3,554 (11.17 per 1000)

Vital statistics for 2007
Source:
 Births: 3,931 (11.32 per 1000, 11.36 for urban areas & 11.20 for rural areas).
 Deaths: 3,863 (11.13 per 1000, 10.49 for urban areas & 13.63 for rural areas).
 Natural Growth Rate: +0.02% per year (+0.09% for urban areas & -0.24% for rural areas).

After nearly two decades, Kamchatka recorded a net natural population growth instead of decline in 2007. However, in first half of 2008, the trend was reversed and population decline was observed again, partly due to an increased mortality rate among the rural population.

Vital statistics for 2012 
 Births: 4 158 (13.0 per 1000)
 Deaths: 3 691 (11.5 per 1000)

Total fertility rate: 
2009 – 1.58 | 2010 – 1.51 | 2011 – 1.61 | 2012 – 1.73 | 2013 – 1.77 | 2014 – 1.85 | 2015 – 1.89 | 2016 – 1.89 | 2017 – 1.78 | 2018 – 1.65 | 2019 – 1.65 | 2020 – 1.68

Ethnic composition
There were 110 recognized ethnic groups in the krai as of 2021. Indigenous peoples of the North made up only 5% of the total population.

27,603 people were registered from administrative databases, and could not declare an ethnicity. It is estimated that the proportion of ethnicities in this group is the same as that of the declared group.

Religion

According to a 2012 survey, 31.2% of the population of Kamchatka adhere to the Russian Orthodox Church, 4.4% are unaffiliated Christians, 0.8% are Orthodox Christians who do not belong to the Russian Orthodox Church. 2% of the population adhere to the Slavic native faith or Siberian shamanism, 1.2% to Islam, 0.6% to forms of Protestantism, and 0.4% to Hinduism. In addition, 22.8% of the population declare themselves to be spiritual but not religious, 21% are atheist, and 14.8% follows other religions or did not give an answer to the question.

See also

 List of Chairmen of the Legislative Assembly of Kamchatka Krai

References

Notes

Sources
 
 
 

 
Far Eastern Federal District
Russian Far East
Pacific Coast of Russia
Krais of Russia
States and territories established in 2007
2007 establishments in Russia
Russian-speaking countries and territories
Road-inaccessible communities of Russia